Sesostrie Youchigant, also known as Sam Young (born ; died December 6, 1948), was a chief of the Tunica-Biloxi tribe and the last known native speaker of the Tunica language. He worked with linguist Mary Haas in 1933 (and during four subsequent visits between 1933 and 1938) to describe what he remembered of the language, which he had learned as a child. He also recounted traditional stories that told of his tribe's migrations and their diplomatic relationships with other tribes. When Haas contacted him, he had not had anyone to talk to in Tunica for nearly twenty years, and was the only individual left who spoke it "with any degree of fluency". Youchigant also spoke Louisiana French as his first language, in addition to English. Haas's 1935 doctoral dissertation, A Grammar of the Tunica Language, was a result of this collaboration. Haas's Tunica Texts (1950) and much of Tunica Dictionary (1953) are also based on her work with Youchigant.

References

External links

Photograph of Sesostrie Youchigant, taken by Mary Haas, American Philosophical Society
Article about the history of the Tunica-Biloxi tribe with a photo of Sesostrie Youchigant

1870s births
1948 deaths
Last known speakers of a Native American language
19th-century Native Americans
Year of birth uncertain
20th-century Native Americans